Football 5-a-side is a sport that has been competed since the 2004 Summer Paralympics. The contest is a single event played by men but not women, so far Brazil have won all the time.

Medalists 

medalists
football 5